Sweet Grass Creek is a tributary of the Yellowstone River, approximately  50 mi (80 km) long, in south central Montana in the United States.

It rises in the Gallatin National Forest, in the Crazy Mountains in eastern Park County. It flows northeast, into Sweet Grass County, then southeast, past Melville, and south, joining the Yellowstone 2 mi (3 km) northwest of Greycliff.

Variant names
Sweet Grass Creek has also been known as: Otter River.

See also

List of rivers of Montana
Montana Stream Access Law

Notes

Rivers of Montana
Rivers of Park County, Montana
Bodies of water of Sweet Grass County, Montana
Tributaries of the Yellowstone River